The Jackson County Courthouse is a former county courthouse in Jacksonville, Oregon, United States, built in 1883. The courthouse is a contributing property of the Jacksonville Historic District, which is listed on the National Register of Historic Places (NRHP). It was formerly the Jacksonville Museum owned by Jackson County and operated by the Southern Oregon Historical Society (SOHS), which also managed several other historic properties in Jacksonville. The museum in the courthouse closed in 2006 because of lack of funding. Ownership of the historic courthouse was transferred to the City of Jacksonville in 2012. The SOHS still operates Hanley Farm in Central Point and a research library in Medford.

The current Jackson County Courthouse, also listed on the NRHP, is in Medford, where the county seat was moved in 1926.

References

External links

Buildings and structures in Jackson County, Oregon
County courthouses in Oregon
National Register of Historic Places in Jackson County, Oregon
Historic American Buildings Survey in Oregon
Defunct museums in Oregon
Jacksonville, Oregon
1883 establishments in Oregon
Historic district contributing properties in Oregon